Nature India  is an online publication by Nature Publishing Group (NPG) that highlights research being produced in India in science and medicine. The international website was launched in February 2008.

Aims and scope 
The aim of Nature India is to give scientists and professionals an insight into the latest research from India.  Each week, the editors survey scientific journals (both in English and in Indian languages) to identify the best recently published papers from India. Unlike other Nature Publishing Group  journals, Nature India posts only research highlights (200-word summaries) that explain the importance of the latest scientific findings in the country.

The website covers topics including:
Astronomy
Biotechnology
Cell and molecular Biology
Chemistry
Clinical medicine
Developmental biology
Earth
 Environment
Ecology 
Evolution
Genetics
Materials
Neuroscience
Physics
Space

References

External links
Nature India international website

Online magazines published in the United Kingdom
Science and technology magazines published in the United Kingdom
Weekly magazines published in the United Kingdom
Magazines established in 2008